Isa Hasan oghlu Musayev (November 27, 1912 – February 8, 1976) was an Azerbaijani theater actor, director, People's Artist of the Azerbaijan SSR.

Biography 
Isa Musayev was born on November 27, 1912, in Nakhchivan. He entered the Nakhchivan Pedagogical College, but left his education unfinished in 1927 and came to Baku, where he studied at the Baku Theater School named after Mirza Fatali Akhundov. After graduating, he returned to Nakhchivan and began working in the theater.

Isa Musayev for the first time in the theater played the role of Sabir in the play "Sabir's trial" directed by Samad Movlavi. In 1930–1940 and 1943–1976, he was one of the leading actors of the Nakhchivan State Musical Dramatic Theatre. In 1940–1943 he worked as an actor and director at the Guba State Drama Theater named after Abbasgulu Bakikhanov. He had been a member of the CPSU since 1942.

Isa Musayev died on February 8, 1976, in Nakhchivan.

Awards 
 People's Artist of the Azerbaijan SSR – May 24, 1960
 Honored Artist of the Azerbaijan SSR – June 17, 1943
 Order of the Badge of Honour

References

Literature 
 
 
 
 
 

Azerbaijani theatre directors
20th-century Azerbaijani male actors
1912 births
1976 deaths
Soviet male actors